Inspiring Generation is a 2014 South Korean television series starring Kim Hyun-joong, Im Soo-hyang and Jin Se-yeon. It aired on KBS2 from January 15 to April 3, 2014 on Wednesdays and Thursdays at 21:55 for 24 episodes.

Plot
A story of violence, love and friendship that travels between Korea, China and Japan in the 1930s.

Shin Jung-tae (Kim Hyun-joong) loses his father at the age of 15 when a Japanese soldier shoots him during the Japanese occupation of Shanghai in the 1930s. But instead of finding justice, Jung-tae is accused of his own father’s death. Jung-tae finds justice only by using his fists in the back alleys of Shanghai, growing up to become the best fighter on the continent.

Cast

Main characters
Kim Hyun-joong as Shin Jung-tae 
Kwak Dong-yeon as young Jung-tae
Im Soo-hyang as Lady Gaya Deguchi
Joo Da-young as young Gaya
Jin Se-yeon as Yoon Ok-ryun 
Ji Woo as young Ok-ryun

Supporting characters

Kim Jae-wook as Kim Soo-ok 
Kim Kap-soo as Toyama Denkai
Choi Jae-sung as Shin Young-chul
Son Byong-ho as Choi Soo-ri
Shin Seung-hwan as Jjang-ddol 
Kim Dong-hee as young Jjang-ddol
Kim Ga-eun as So-so
Yoon Hyun-min as Toyama Aoki
Choi Cheol-ho as Shinjo Deguchi 
Shin Eun-jung as Kim Sung-deok
Lee Cho-hee as Mal-sook
Kim Min-ha as young Mal-sook
Bae Noo-ri as Yang-yang
Jo Dong-hyuk as Shinichi
Choi Ji-ho as Aka
Kwak Seung-nam as Genjo
Yang Ik-june as Hwang Bong-shik
Jo Dal-hwan as Poong-cha
Ji Seung-hyun as Kang-gae
Nuel as Kkab-sae
Kim Sung-oh as Jung Jae-hwa
Kim Seo-kyung as Mang-chi
Yoo Tae-woong as Shin Ma-juk
Seo Dong-gun as Cha Sang-ki
Choi Il-hwa as Seol Doo-sung
Jung Ho-bin as Wang Baek-san
Song Jae-rim as Mo Il-hwa
Lee Joon-seok as Won-pyung
Lee Chul-min as Bul-gom
Uhm Tae-goo as Do-goo
Oh Soon-tae as Omogari
Kim Roi-ha as Shin Ga-jum
Park Chul-min as Old Man Fly 
Kim Se-jung as Shin Chung-ah
Lee Ji-woo as young Chung-ah
Kim Byung-ki as Fortune teller
So Hee-jung as Mok Po-daek, Mal-sook's mother
Lee Sang-hee as Kim Cheom-ji
Jung Jin as Yamamoto Hagesawa
Im Hyung-joon as Koichi
Jo Ha-seok as Sasaki
Im Se-hwan as Tamada
Moon Hee-kyung as Nun director 
Hwang Chae-won as Ran-ran
Kim Yoon-hee as Ryoko Deguchi
Yeo Ho-min as Ma Dang-ga
Lee Hae-in as Sun Woo-jin
Han Je-in as Dan-shim
Kim Jae-kyung as Meiling
Tae Hang-ho as Moon-bok

Original soundtrack

Part 1

Part 2

Part 3

Part 4

Part 5

Part 6

Part 7

Ratings

Awards and nominations

International broadcast
While it aired in Korea, the drama was simultaneously available online (with subtitles in several languages) on Singapore-based video streaming website Viki.

It aired in Japan on cable channel DATV beginning August 9, 2014.

In Thailand aired on PPTV HD beginning March 20, 2015.

References

External links
  
 
 
 

2014 South Korean television series debuts
2014 South Korean television series endings
Korean Broadcasting System television dramas
Korean-language television shows
Television shows based on manhwa
Television series set in Korea under Japanese rule
South Korean action television series
South Korean romance television series
Second Sino-Japanese War television drama series